Domingo Sapelli (1895–1961) was a Uruguayan stage and film actor. After emigrating to Argentina he appeared in around fifty films during his career.

Selected filmography
 The Soul of the Accordion (1935)
 Santos Vega (1936)
 Juan Moreira (1936)
 The Caranchos of Florida (1938)
 Only the Valiant (1940)
 Savage Pampas (1945)
 María Rosa (1946)
 Juan Moreira (1948)
 Passport to Rio (1950)
 Fangio, the Demon of the Tracks (1950)
 Marianela (1955)

References

Bibliography 
 Finkielman, Jorge. The Film Industry in Argentina: An Illustrated Cultural History. McFarland, 24 Dec 2003.

External links 
 

1895 births
1961 deaths
Uruguayan male film actors
Argentine male film actors
Uruguayan male stage actors
Argentine male stage actors